The 1979 Texas Rangers season involved the Rangers finishing 3rd in the American League West with a record of 83 wins and 79 losses.

Offseason 
 October 3, 1978: Len Barker and Bobby Bonds were traded by the Rangers to the Cleveland Indians for Larvell Blanks and Jim Kern.
 October 24, 1978: Sandy Alomar Sr. was released by the Rangers.
 October 25, 1978: Mike Hargrove, Kurt Bevacqua, and Bill Fahey were traded by the Rangers to the San Diego Padres for Oscar Gamble, Dave Roberts and $300,000.
 November 10, 1978: Dave Righetti, Juan Beníquez, Mike Griffin, Paul Mirabella, and Greg Jemison (minors) were traded by the Rangers to the New York Yankees for Domingo Ramos, Mike Heath, Sparky Lyle, Larry McCall, Dave Rajsich, and cash.
 December 8, 1978: Jim Mason was traded by the Rangers to the Montreal Expos for Mike Hart.

Regular season 
 June 24, 1979: Rickey Henderson made his major league debut for the Oakland Athletics in a game against the Rangers. Henderson had 4 at bats with 2 hits, and 1 stolen base.

Season standings

Record vs. opponents

Notable transactions 
 May 4, 1979: Bert Campaneris was traded by the Rangers to the California Angels for Dave Chalk.
 June 15, 1979: Dock Ellis was traded by the Rangers to the New York Mets for Bob Myrick and Mike Bruhert.
 June 15, 1979: Eric Soderholm was traded by the Chicago White Sox to the Texas Rangers for Ed Farmer and Gary Holle.
 August 1, 1979: Oscar Gamble, Amos Lewis (minors) and players to be named later were traded by the Rangers to the New York Yankees for Mickey Rivers and players to be named later. The Rangers completed the deal by sending Ray Fontenot and Gene Nelson to the Yankees on October 8. The Yankees completed the deal by sending Bob Polinsky (minors), Neal Mersch (minors), and Mark Softy (minors) to the Rangers on October 8.

Roster

Player stats

Batting

Starters by position 
Note: Pos = Position; G = Games played; AB = At bats; H = Hits; Avg. = Batting average; HR = Home runs; RBI = Runs batted in

Other batters 
Note: G = Games played; AB = At bats; H = Hits; Avg. = Batting average; HR = Home runs; RBI = Runs batted in

Pitching

Starting pitchers 
Note: G = Games pitched; IP = Innings pitched; W = Wins; L = Losses; ERA = Earned run average; SO = Strikeouts

Other pitchers 
Note: G = Games pitched; IP = Innings pitched; W = Wins; L = Losses; ERA = Earned run average; SO = Strikeouts

Relief pitchers 
Note: G = Games pitched; W = Wins; L = Losses; SV = Saves; ERA = Earned run average; SO = Strikeouts

Awards and honors 
Jim Kern, Rolaids Relief Man of the Year Award
Buddy Bell, 3B, Gold Glove
Jim Sundberg, C, Gold Glove

All-Stars 
All-Star Game

Farm system

Notes

References 
1979 Texas Rangers team page at Baseball Reference
1979 Texas Rangers team page at www.baseball-almanac.com

Texas Rangers seasons
Texas Rangers season
Texas Rangers